Forget the World is the 1997 debut album of The Hippos, jointly released by Fueled by Ramen Records and Stiff Dog Records originally, and then Fueled by Ramen and Vagrant Records. The band was offered the chance to record the album based on the song of the same name, which became the album's title track. A track from the album, Irie, was used on the soundtrack of the movie The Extreme Adventures of Super Dave, which was released straight to video in January 2000.

Track listing

References

1997 debut albums
The Hippos albums